Calochroa is a genus of beetles belonging to the family Cicindelidae. Some authors treat them within the broader genus Cicindela. The genus as used in 2020 shows polyphyly with Calochroa species forming two clades with one clade being a sister to the genus Lophyra and another being a sister to the genus Hipparidium.

Nearly 33 species are known with a distribution in Africa, the Indian subcontinent, to Southeast Asia. Some species in the genus include:

Calochroa anometallescens Calochroa bicolor Calochroa bramani Calochroa brancuccii Calochroa carissima Calochroa crucigera Calochroa elegantula Calochroa flavomaculata Calochroa fumikoae Calochroa hamiltoniana Calochroa harmandi Calochroa holzschuhi Calochroa horii Calochroa interruptofasciata Calochroa moraveci Calochroa pseudosiamensis Calochroa salvazai Calochroa whithillii''

References

Cicindelidae